ATN-Asian Radio is an SiriusXM Satellite Radio channel featuring programming dedicated South Asian community in North America.  This channel's content is produced by Asian Television Network. The channel features: talk and phone-in shows, music and poetry, news and current affairs, and live cricket commentary.  The channel was in preview mode from 2007-09-24 until 2007-10-29 at 6 PM ET, at which point it was formally launched. The majority of the talk shows are in English with substantial coverage  in Punjabi, Hindi, and other South Asian languages.

On April 18, 2008, ATN-Asian Radio started broadcasting live Indian Premier League matches on the channel as a part of Asian Television Network International Limited broadcasting rights It was initially available on XM Satellite Radio, but then just Sirius as part of Multicultural Radio. ATN Asian Radio airs every evening from 6 PM Eastern - 3 AM Eastern, and the remainder of the airtime is dedicated to Aboriginal Canadian programming from Voices Radio.

References

External links 
 Official ATN-Asian Radio website
 ATN-Asian Radio page on Sirius XM
 ATN-Asian Radio Schedule

XM Satellite Radio channels
Sirius XM Radio channels
Satellite radio stations in Canada
Multicultural and ethnic radio stations in Canada
South Asian Canadian culture
Radio stations established in 2007